Albert Park Football Club is an Australian rules football club located 3 km south of Melbourne in the suburb of Albert Park.

The Albert Park Football Club is affiliated with the Victorian Amateur Football Association (VAFA), a competition that covers all of greater metropolitan Melbourne. The VAFA has over 70 senior clubs, and around 3,500 registered players. The club has its origins going back to the 1950s as the ANZ Bank Football Club and has evolved from an affiliation with the ANZ Staff Social Club of Victoria to its current suburban identity in the inner-suburban Albert Park area of Melbourne.

Known as the Falcons, the Club has relocated on a number of occasions, the most recent being the move from the former Clubrooms and playing area on Oval 15 when the Albert Park Australian F1 Grand Prix site was redeveloped in the 1990s. The Club is now situated at the Beaurepaire Pavilion on Oval 20.

Club song 
Cheer, cheer the Red and the Blue
We'll keep on fighting all the game through
Soaring to Success we fly
Shake down the thunder from the sky
Whether the odds are great or be small
The Falcons from the Park will win overall
While our loyal Falcs are marching
Onwards to victory

History - Albert Park Football Club (1999 to present) 

1999 - ANZ BANK FOOTBALL CLUB CHANGES ITS NAME TO ALBERT PARK FOOTBALL CLUB

Committee members from the Albert Park Football Club and the Middle Park Cricket Club meet to form the Albert Park & Middle Park Sports Club. This entity is used to negotiate a new lease with Parks Victoria.

The Club makes the F Section Grand Final, but are defeated by Eley Park 8.9 (57) to Albert Park 5.13 (43).

2002 - ALBERT PARK FOOTBALL CLUB WINS PREMIERSHIP

D4 Reserve (formerly F Reserve) Premiers - Albert Park 13.17 (95) defeated Werribee 8.10 (58) to win the Club’s first premiership since 1974.

2009 - ALBERT PARK FOOTBALL CLUB PROMOTED TO DIVISION 3

Senior team finishes the Division 4 home and away season on top of the Ladder with 17 wins and 1 loss, but are defeated by La Trobe University in the Grand Final - Albert Park 8.11 (59) defeated by La Trobe University 21.9 (135).

History - ANZ Bank Football Club (1954 to 1998) 

1954 - ANZ BANK FOOTBALL CLUB (Zedders) ESTABLISHED

Sports minded officers at the ANZ Bank Head Office (394 Collins St) Branch of the ANZ Bank banded together to form a founding committee, who negotiated a place in the 10 team VAFA E Section competition for an ANZ Bank team. Many players were returned service-men from World War 2, with a fair sprinkling of enthusiastic youngsters. The home ground was at Yarra Bend, Fairfield (Olney Oval). Facilities were primitive, showers were cold and there was no power in the changing sheds. Training was conducted at (what was then) Wright Street Oval in Albert Park, which is now the Golf Driving Range.

It was a formidable challenge to form a football team from scratch, in days when bank staff worked Saturday mornings, few owned cars and player facilities such as hot water, trainers etc. were unavailable. Very few of these inaugural members could have foreseen a future spanning more than 50 years from such humble beginnings.

INAUGURAL ANZ BANK FOOTBALL CLUB TEAM/COMMITTEE

A BRANNAN (Coach), H BRAY, J CARRUTHERS, B CHRISTENSEN, G CROXFORD, N DIBBIN, W J DUNN (President), J ELLIS, J FRANCIS, W GARDINER, N HALLIDAY, V KENNEDY (Captain), M LINARD, T LIVINGSTONE, F LYONS, A McKAY, R J PRICE, G RIDGWAY, C SPENCER, R STONE, D STRAIN, M WILLMOTT (Secretary)

1956 - ANZ BANK FOOTBALL CLUB RELOCATES

Yarra Bend was seen as a most unsatisfactory home ground. The then Secretary of the ANZ Bank Staff Social Club, J M (Jack) Hodges, who was a trustee of Caulfield Park pulled a few strings to get the club a use of an oval there for home games. Training was at Princess Park, Carlton next to the Carlton FC.

1958 - ANZ BANK FOOTBALL CLUB PROMOTED TO D SECTION

The Club makes the E Section Grand Final, but are defeated by St Kilda C.B.O.C. - 12.14 (86) to ANZ Bank 10.13 (73).

1959 - ANZ BANK FOOTBALL CLUB RELOCATES TO ALBERT PARK

Home ground transferred to Oval 10, Albert Park adjacent to the then Middle Park railway station (where the tennis courts now stand).

1962 - ANZ BANK FOOTBALL CLUB RESERVES TEAM

Support for the Club was growing both on and off the field and it was decided to field a Reserves side. With players working at suburban branches, the Club sometimes struggled to get the minimum 16 players afield at noon. However it was deemed an essential part of the Club’s future.

1963 - ANZ BANK FOOTBALL CLUB RELOCATES TO FLINDERS PARK

Home ground transferred from Albert Park to Flinders Park, Batman Avenue. Now known as Melbourne Park, this was a very central location, with dual changing facilities, which also serviced Old Scotch Collegians at their adjacent oval. Despite some shortcomings in the facilities such as coldness generated from open mesh windows and door etc. this was a very convenient location which served the Club well until 1978 when there were plans to completely redevelop this quarter of Melbourne. The Club would ultimately give way to the building of the Rod Laver Arena, which is now situated on this hallowed turf, and move back to Albert Park, which would prove to be a long term tenancy for the Club.

Whilst at Flinders Park the Club prospered, due largely to the efforts of long term Treasurer Keith Findlay and a string of very capable long serving Presidents such as Geoff Ridgway and Bruce Robertson. Training lights (a luxury in this era) were erected, at what seemed like an enormous cost, and the Club were the envy of other sporting bodies at Flinders Park.

1966 - ANZ BANK FOOTBALL CLUB RELEGATED TO E SECTION

The Club finishes 10th, with just 1 win and 17 losses and is relegated to E Section.

1969 - ANZ BANK FOOTBALL CLUB WINS FIRST PREMIERSHIP

E Reserve Section Premiers - ANZ Bank 10.6 (66) defeated Brunswick 6.12 (48) to win the Club’s first premiership.

1969 - E.S. & A. BANK FOOTBALL CLUB DISBAND AND JOIN WITH ANZ BANK FOOTBALL CLUB
 
Following the merger of the E.S. & A. Bank with the ANZ Bank, the E.S. & A. Bank Football Club disband with players, committee and supporters invited and encouraged to join the ANZ Bank Football Club. The influx of players was not as great as hoped for, although some excellent players such as Jim Kelly did join the ranks at a time when there was difficulty for both the E.S. & A. Bank and ANZ Bank fielding teams each week.

1974 - ANZ BANK FOOTBALL CLUB WINS SECOND PREMIERSHIP

E Reserve Section Premiers - ANZ Bank 11.11 (77) defeated Old Geelong Grammarians 9.14 (68) to win the Club’s second premiership.

1978 - ANZ BANK FOOTBALL CLUB RELOCATES TO ALBERT PARK

1978 marked the 25th season of the ANZ Bank Football Club and saw it return to Albert Park, firstly to Oval 15. Again the clubrooms were fairly basic, but this was to be the forerunner of a long association with the Albert Park Trust, with steadily improved facilities and, in later years, other ANZ sporting activities coming to join our identity there.

1982 - ANZ BANK FOOTBALL CLUB RELEGATED TO F SECTION

The Club finishes 10th, with 0 wins and 16 losses and is relegated to F Section.

1987 - UPGRADE OF FACILITIES AT ALBERT PARK

For all the hard work the players and committee put into the Club, the 1980s proved to be an extremely disappointing era as far as on field success was concerned. It was difficult to recruit new players and there was a constant battle to field two sides.

The facilities for the players and supporters had always been very primitive up to this stage. Kevin Mitchell (ANZ Staff Staff Club Secretary/Manager) a great supporter of the Club put forward a very ambitious suggestion that involved seeking sole control of the building housing the change rooms etc. from the Albert Park Trust and renovating the facilities to better cater for the players and spectators. Kevin’s vision also included transferring the ANZ Bank Cricket Club from Fawkner Park to utilise the oval and facilities during the Summer cricket season. With the assistance of Harry Birkenfelds, who was at the time working in the ANZ Bank Property Department, Kevin and Harry drew up plans in an endeavour to put this dream into reality. Kevin successfully lobbied the ANZ Staff Club committee to provide the necessary funding to upgrade the facilities. The finished project provided excellent player (and umpire) facilities, as well as under cover viewing and seating for supporters, timekeepers and catering volunteers. This was of great benefit for the likes of our long term supporter/life member Alan Heany, who never missed a game for so many years and was always a welcome sight rugged up in his traditional hat and gaberdine overcoat.

The ANZ Bank Soccer Club who played on a nearby soccer ground also utilised the facilities which became somewhat of an ANZ sporting complex.

Due to the Australian F1 Grand Prix starting in 1996, the ANZ Staff Social Club would be later forced to relinquish this most popular site and move to the Beaurepaire Pavilion to make way for the Grand Prix Pit area.

1991 - ANZ BANK FOOTBALL CLUB PROMOTED TO E SECTION

Senior team finishes the F Section home and away season on top of the Ladder with 17 wins and 1 loss, but are defeated by Elsternwick in the Grand Final - ANZ Bank 13.16 (94) defeated by Elsternwick 15.14 (104).

1993 - ANZ BANK FOOTBALL CLUB RELEGATED TO F SECTION

The Club finishes 10th, with just 2 wins and 16 losses and is relegated to F Section.

1995 - REDEVELOPMENT OF THE ALBERT PARK GRAND PRIX SITE

The Club is forced to relocate for the 1995 season due to the redevelopment of the Albert Park Grand Prix site and plays its home games at Mackie Road Reserve, East Bentleigh.

The VAFA splits E Section three ways (1995–97) in lieu of an F Section. The new structure being 'E South', 'E Central' and 'E East'. ANZ Bank is placed in the 'E South' Section.

1996 - ANZ BANK FOOTBALL CLUB RETURNS TO ALBERT PARK

Home ground moved to Oval 20, Beaurepaire Pavilion in Albert Park. The facilities are shared with the ANZ Bank Cricket Club, the ANZ Bank Soccer Club and the Middle Park Cricket Club.

The Club plays under the joint name ANZ Albert Park (1996–98) and is nicknamed the Rats.

1999 - ANZ BANK FOOTBALL CLUB CHANGES ITS NAME TO ALBERT PARK FOOTBALL CLUB

The increasing interest from the local community and diminishing interest and support from the ANZ Bank and the ANZ Staff Social Club resulted in the imminent change of name to Albert Park Football Club.

History - E.S. & A. Bank Football Club (1932 to 1969) 

1932 - E.S. & A. BANK FOOTBALL CLUB JOINS THE VAFA COMPETITION

E.S. & A. Bank Football Club joins the VAFA competition. The Club makes the D Section Grand Final and are Runners Up in their first season - E.S. & A. Bank 4.11 (35) defeated by West Brunswick 10.11 (71).

1933 - E.S. & A. BANK FOOTBALL CLUB WINS FIRST PREMIERSHIP

The Club wins its first premiership and promotion to B Section - E.S. & A. Bank 13.17 (95) defeated West Brunswick 7.12 (54).

1934 - E.S. & A. BANK FOOTBALL CLUB GOES BACK-TO-BACK

The Club wins its second premiership and promotion to A Section - E.S. & A. Bank 10.8 (68) defeated West Brunswick 6.13 (49).

1936 - E.S. & A. BECOMES E.S. & A. - NATIONAL BANK

The Club plays in the VAFA B Section competition (1936–37) under the joint name E.S. & A. - National Bank.

1939 - NATIONAL BANK IS DISBANDED

The Club does not play during the War years. The VAFA competition is put in recess (1940–45). Some 3000 plus VAFA players and officials served in World War 2.
 
1952 - E.S. & A. BANK FOOTBALL CLUB RE-JOINS THE VAFA COMPETITION

After the war a directive was issued from the Bank’s Administration to reform the sporting clubs. 
The then Social Secretary, Alan Mierisch, in conjunction with Roy Gumley and Staff Department contacted pre war players and interested parties in Melbourne Office (388 Collins St) and Royal Bank Branch (293 Collins St) and arranged training and practice games at Princess Park, Carlton. Eventually a team was formed in 1952 to play in D Section.

1953 - E.S. & A. BANK FOOTBALL CLUB PROMOTED TO C SECTION

The Club makes the D Section Grand Final, but are defeated by Footscray T.S.O.B. - 5.7 (37) to E.S. & A. Bank 3.14 (32).

1957 - E.S. & A. BANK FOOTBALL CLUB PROMOTED TO B SECTION

The Club makes the C Section Grand Final, but are defeated by Old Geelong Grammarians 11.10 (76) to E.S. & A. Bank 8.9 (57).

1958 - E.S. & A. BANK FOOTBALL CLUB RELEGATED TO C SECTION

The competition in B Section is a bit too good and the Club is relegated to C Section.

1960 - E.S. & A. BANK FOOTBALL CLUB RELEGATED TO D SECTION

C Section brought with it a complete change of personnel on and off the field and the Club is relegated to D Section.

1962 - E.S. & A. BANK FOOTBALL CLUB RELEGATED TO E SECTION

Again, the competition is too good and the Club is relegated to E Section.

1963 - E.S. & A. BANK FOOTBALL CLUB RESERVES TEAM

The Club fields a Reserves side.

1965 - E.S. & A. BANK FOOTBALL CLUB WINS PREMIERSHIP

E Reserve Section Premiers - E.S. & A. Bank 10.9 (69) defeated Old Xaverians 7.7 (49).

1969 - E.S. & A. BANK FOOTBALL CLUB DISBAND AND JOIN WITH ANZ BANK FOOTBALL CLUB
 
The ANZ Bank and the E.S. & A. Bank football clubs both played in the VAFA E Section competition in 1969 and on 21 June 1969 the ANZ Bank 7.16 (58) defeated the E.S. & A. Bank 8.2 (50).

Following completion of the 1969 season, the E.S. & A. Bank Football Club disband with players, committee and supporters invited and encouraged to join the ANZ Bank Football Club.

External links
 Official Albert Park Football Club website
 Victorian Amateur Football Association (VAFA) website

Victorian Amateur Football Association clubs
1954 establishments in Australia
Australian rules football clubs established in 1954
Australian rules football clubs in Melbourne
Sport in the City of Port Phillip